Cirsium hosokawai is a flowering plant of the family Asteraceae endemic to Taiwan and found in alpine meadows above 3,500 meters in elevation.

参考文献 
 

hosokawai
Endemic flora of Taiwan